This is a list of the weightlifters who will be participating for their country at the 2016 Summer Olympics in Rio de Janeiro, Brazil from  August 5–21, 2016. 260 weightlifters are set to participate at the Games across fifteen events.

Male weightlifters

Female weightlifters

References

 http://www.iwf.net/results/athletes/
  

Lists of weightlifters
Weightlifting at the 2016 Summer Olympics

Weightlifters